The National Women's Soccer League Player of the Month is a monthly soccer award given to individual players in the National Women's Soccer League. The honor is awarded to the player deemed to have put in the best performances over the past month by a panel of journalists who regularly cover the league.

Winners

2013

2014

2015

2016

2017

2018

2019

2021

2022

Multiple winners

The below table lists those who have won on more than one occasion.

See also 

 List of sports awards honoring women
 NWSL Rookie of the Month
 NWSL Player of the Week
 NWSL Team of the Month
 NWSL awards
 NWSL records and statistics
 Women's soccer in the United States

References

Player of the Month
Association football player of the month awards
Awards established in 2013
Player of the Month
Lists of women's association football players
Association football player non-biographical articles